Ludwig Böck (7 September 1902 – 14 March 1960) was a German skier. He competed at the 1928 Winter Olympics in St. Moritz, where he placed seventh in Nordic combined, and 14th in the 18 km cross-country.

In 1935 Böck founded the first skiing school at Nesselwang. His son Helmut competed at the 1952 and 1956 Winter Olympics in the same events as his father.

References

External links

1902 births
1960 deaths
German male Nordic combined skiers
German male cross-country skiers
Olympic Nordic combined skiers of Germany
Olympic cross-country skiers of Germany
Cross-country skiers at the 1928 Winter Olympics
Nordic combined skiers at the 1928 Winter Olympics